Bus Simulator 21 is a bus simulator game developed by Stillalive Studios and published by Astragon Entertainment. It is developed on the Unreal Engine 4. It is the sixth in the Bus Simulator series, and is the direct sequel to Bus Simulator 18. The game has been released on 7 September 2021 for Microsoft Windows, PlayStation 4 and Xbox One.

Gameplay
Bus Simulator 21 takes place in "Angel Shores", a new fictional modern city located in the United States which is based on the San Francisco Bay Area. The game features a coastline and districts like Chinatown. In addition to the California map, the game will have a revised "Seaside Valley" map from its predecessor Bus Simulator 18. Vehicle-wise, the game introduces a double-decker bus, such as the officially-licensed Alexander Dennis Enviro500, as well as electric buses to the series. Further licensed bus brands include Blue Bird, BYD, Grande West, Iveco, MAN, Mercedes-Benz, Scania, Setra and Volvo. The game also offers a cooperative multiplayer mode. A career mode would be available following the Next Stop major update.

Development and release

Stillalive Studios and Astragon Entertainment will remain as the series developer and publisher respectively. The game was targeted for a 2021 release for Microsoft Windows, PlayStation 4 and Xbox One. The release date was later confirmed on 7 September 2021. A major update to the game, titled Next Stop, is scheduled to be released on 23 May 2023, with ninth generation of video game consoles PlayStation 5 and Xbox Series X/S available.

Reception 
Bus Simulator 21 received "mixed or average" reviews according to review aggregator Metacritic.

References

External links 

  

2021 video games
Bus simulation video games
Bus Simulator
Multiplayer and single-player video games
PlayStation 4 games
PlayStation 5 games
Unreal Engine games
Video games developed in Austria
Video games set in the United States
Video game sequels
Windows games
Xbox One games
Xbox Series X and Series S games